The Digges Amendment was an amendment to the Maryland Constitution proposed in 1910 to curtail the Fifteen Amendment of the United States Constitution and disenfranchise black voters in the state with the use of a property requirement. It was an initiative by the predominately white conservative Democratic Party members in the state.

The amendment was drafted by Democratic state delegate (lower house) Walter Digges and co-sponsored by state senator (upper house) William J. Frere. The proposal was passed by the Democratic-dominated Maryland General Assembly and approved by Governor Austin Lane Crothers but was not ratified by the required general election voter referendum.

History
After a brief period of Republican control in Maryland from 1896 to 1900, when the party was supported by many African Americans, Democrats regained control of the government on a white supremacist platform. They were responding to the rise of elected African-American Republican politicians in municipal and state offices. The Democrats made three separate attempts to amend the Maryland Constitution so as to disenfranchise the black votes: the Poe Amendment of 1905, the Strauss Amendment of 1908-1909 and the Digges Amendment of 1910-1911. All three of the proposals were subsequently defeated by voter referendums.

The Digges Amendment, if ratified, would have granted the right to votes for all white male citizens over the age of 21. All other men had to prove to have owned and paid taxes on a minimum of $500 worth of property for two previous consecutive years. Along with the introduction of this amendment and before the general election referendum of 1911, the Maryland General Assembly also attempted to pass a temporary voter registration law that would limit the votes from black-majority counties. This law was vetoed by the Governor due to popular opposition, as African Americans were politically active and fought this law. All male Marylanders continued to have the chance to vote in the election.

Maryland did not ratify the Fifteenth Amendment in 1870. Digges and Frere, both from the Republican stronghold of Charles County, argued that the amendment provisions did not apply at the state level. The Digges plan was opposed by Southern leaders, who were concerned that such extreme and blatant challenge to the Fifteen Amendment would undermine their own legal attempts underway to circumvent the enfranchisement of black votes. Beginning with Mississippi in 1890, most Southern states had passed new constitutions and other laws that made voter registration more difficult and effectively disenfranchised most blacks.

In Maryland's unrestricted general election of 1911, the Digges Amendment was defeated with 46,220 votes for and 83,920 votes against the proposal. The Democratic gubernatorial ticket lost to the Republican ticket by a much closer margin.

References

1910 in Maryland
African-American history of Maryland
Anti-black racism in Maryland
Anti-immigration politics in the United States
Class discrimination
History of Maryland
History of racism in Maryland
History of voting rights in the United States